"Hold My Hand" may refer to:

Film and television
 Hold My Hand (film), a 1938 British film directed by Thornton Freeland
 Hold My Hand (TV series), a 2013 South Korean soap opera

Music
 "Hold My Hand" (Dave Davies song), 1969
 "Hold My Hand" (1953 song), by Jack Lawrence and Richard Myers
 "Hold My Hand" (Sean Paul song), 2009, featuring Keri Hilson
 "Hold My Hand" (Michael Jackson and Akon song), 2010
 "Hold My Hand" (Hootie & the Blowfish song), 1994
 "Hold My Hand" (Jess Glynne song), 2015
 "Hold My Hand" (Lady Gaga song), 2022
 "Hold My Hand", song from the musical Me and My Girl
 "Hold My Hand", a song by New Found Glory on their album Coming Home
 "Hold My Hand", a song by Maher Zain on his album Thank You Allah
 "Hold My Hand", a song by Beatles parody group the Rutles
 "Hold My Hand", a 2014 song by the Fray from Helios
 "Hold My Hand", a song by Lukas Graham from 3 (The Purple Album)

See also
 Take My Hand (disambiguation)